The 1958 NBA playoffs was the postseason tournament of the National Basketball Association's 1957-58 season. The tournament concluded with the Western Division champion St. Louis Hawks defeating the Eastern Division champion Boston Celtics 4 games to 2 in the NBA Finals.

It was the second straight year the Celtics and Hawks met in the Finals; they met four out of five years, with the Celtics winning three series and the Hawks one.

This was the first (and as of 2020, only) title in Hawks franchise history. St. Louis made it to the NBA Finals four times in five years between 1957–1961, but since moving to Atlanta in 1968, they have had considerably less success in the playoffs.

Bracket

Division Semifinals

Eastern Division Semifinals

(2) Syracuse Nationals vs. (3) Philadelphia Warriors

This was the sixth playoff meeting between these two teams, with the 76ers/Nationals winning four of the first five meetings.

Western Division Semifinals

(2) Detroit Pistons vs. (3) Cincinnati Royals

This was the sixth playoff meeting between these two teams, with the Royals winning three of the first five meetings while the Pistons were based in Fort Wayne and the Royals were based in Rochester.

Division Finals

Eastern Division Finals

(1) Boston Celtics vs. (3) Philadelphia Warriors

This was the first playoff meeting between these two teams.

Western Division Finals

(1) St. Louis Hawks vs. (2) Detroit Pistons

This was the second playoff meeting between these two teams, with the Pistons winning the first meeting while being based in Fort Wayne.

NBA Finals: (E1) Boston Celtics vs. (W1) St. Louis Hawks

 Andy Phillip and Arnie Risen’s final NBA game.
 Bob Pettit's 50 points tied the then-NBA playoff record at the time.

This was the second playoff meeting between these two teams, with the Celtics winning the first meeting.

References

External links
Basketball-Reference.com's 1958 NBA Playoffs page

National Basketball Association playoffs
Playoffs

fi:NBA-kausi 1957–1958#Pudotuspelit